The fourth season of Teenage Mutant Ninja Turtles originally aired between September 10, 2005 and April 15, 2006, beginning with the "Cousin Sid" episode. Fourteen random episodes from this season were released on DVD on September 12, 2006. Much of this season focused on Leonardo, the group's leader, who became bitter, reserved and isolated following the final episode of the previous season in which he, his brothers and their master were almost killed. He went so far as to lash out at Splinter, causing him serious injury. This season is known among of fans as the darkest season of the series.

Story
In the wake of their final battle with the Shredder, the Turtles retreat to the Jones family farmhouse to rest and recuperate, still heavily wounded and scarred. Leonardo in particular carries strong emotional scars from the battle, blaming himself for his family having to nearly sacrifice their lives to stop the Shredder. After the Turtles return to New York, they find that Hun has defected from the Foot Clan, instead returning to the Purple Dragons and transforming them from a street gang to a sophisticated crime organization. A successful raid on an Earth Protection Force train ends up being the final straw for the President of the United States, who threatens to cut the organization's funding for their repeated recent failures. Desperate to keep his organization afloat, Bishop engineers a staged alien invasion with man-made "aliens", which successfully convinces the President of his organization's value to protect the Earth. Unknown to Bishop, however, the residue from the destroyed alien clones leaks into New York City's sewers, and after coming into contact with local fauna, mutates them, triggering a massive mutant outbreak. During this outbreak, Baxter Stockman finally clones a new human body for himself, but it along with his sanity deteriorates, and he eventually drowns in the Hudson River while attacking April O'Neil. Nevertheless, Bishop brings him back from the dead in another cyborg body, deeming him too useful to lose.

In the meantime, Leo's emotional scars drive him to become progressively more hostile and surly to the point of wounding Splinter in an uncontrollable rage during a training session. Splinter sends Leo on a pilgrimage to the Ancient One, Hamato Yoshi's own master and father figure. The Ancient One is able to heal Leo's deep self-doubt and psychological scars, and takes the turtle under his wing. Back in New York, Karai takes up the Shredder's mantle, and rebuilds the Foot Clan to become a much more powerful organization, and with the help of the Foot Mystics, find the Turtles' lair and destroy it. Raphael, Michelangelo, Donatello, Splinter, and Klunk fake their deaths as they go into hiding. The Ancient One, having foreseen the attack, sends Leo back to New York, where he reunites his family and finds them a new home before defeating Karai, vowing that any further conflict between their clans will result in her death.

The Turtles struggle to fight Bishop's mutant outbreak, but things take a turn for the worse when Donnie is infected with the chemical agent responsible for the outbreak, mutating him once again. Leatherhead reports that Bishop's chemical agent is reacting violently with the Utrom mutagen already in his body, and will kill him in a matter of days. The group heads to Area 51 to ask for Bishop's aid in returning their brother to normal. Bishop agrees, but charges the Turtles with retrieving the Heart of Tengu, a relic possessed by Karai that an unknown entity has promised will grant him centuries of advancement in technology. The Turtles fulfill the agreement, and thanks to Leatherhead and Stockman's joint effort, cure Don and return him to normal. Meanwhile, Bishop inadvertently destroys the Heart of Tengu, having been fooled into doing so by the entity, who is revealed to be the Water Foot Mystic. The Heart of Tengu was an artifact that enabled the leaders of the Foot Clan to keep the Foot Mystics under their control. Now free, the Foot Mystics resolve to revive the "one, true Shredder".

In the season finale, the Turtles find themselves abducted by the mysterious Ninja Tribunal, along with four other warriors from across the globe. The 8 warriors are informed they are being drafted to combat a great evil that is poised to return, and they are taken to the Tribunal's monastery in Japan after passing their first test of character.

Cast
 Michael Sinterniklaas as Leo: the leader of the Turtles who becomes very bitter after the Shredder's defeat. (26 episodes)
 Wayne Grayson as Mike: the Turtles' youngest member and a source of comic relief. (25 episodes)
 Sam Riegel as Don: the Turtles' genius engineer who is identified as the member who holds the team together. He suffers from a second mutation caused by the mutant outbreak, which is the cause for the final events of the season and, indirectly, for the events of the next season. (25 episodes (appears only in his non-speaking second mutation form in episode 24))
 Frank Frankson as Raph: Leo's second-in-command who took over as leader when Leo was with the ancient one. (25 episodes)

Supporting 
 Darren Dunstan as Splinter: the Turtles' sensei and adopted father, who comes to realize his destiny as a guardian of the Utroms. (17 episodes)
 Veronica Taylor as April: an ally of the Turtles who enters a relationship with Casey. (14 episodes)
 Marc Thompson as Casey: an ally of the Turtles who enters a relationship with April. (12 episodes)
 Gary K. Lewis as Leatherhead: a mutant alligator who is a loyal ally of the Turtles.

Villains
 Karen Neill as Karai: the Shredder's adopted daughter and second-in-command, whose allegiance and devoted service come into question, as Leonardo tries to convince her to change sides. After the defeat of Ch'rell the last season finale, Karai vows to avenge him taking the mantle of the Shredder and serving as one of the two main antagonists of season 4.
 David Zen Mansley as Bishop: a black ops agent in charge of the Earth Protection Force, an organization devoted to defending Earth from alien invasion. He plays a central role in the season serving as one of the two main antagonists, after the Shredder's defeat.
 Scott Williams as Stockman: a brilliant scientist who allies himself with Bishop to get revenge on the Turtles. (8 episodes)
 Greg Carey as Hun: a hulking gangster who is a former member of the Foot and the leader of the Purple Dragons, who tries to increase their reputation after the Shredder's defeat.

Recurring
 Jason Griffith as Miyamoto Usagi: an ally of the Turtles and a close friend to Leonardo who Splinter asked to help Leo to become more expressive about his feelings.
 David Chen as The Ancient One: an old ninjutsu master who taught Hamato Yoshi and helps Leonardo overcome his fears.
 Scottie Ray as Ch'rell / The Shredder: the main antagonist of the series and leader of the Foot Clan. He was defeated and imprisoned by the Utrom Council on an ice asteroid for eternity. He only appears in the season in flashbacks or as an illusion. (3 episodes (has no lines in episode 19))

Crew
Teenage Mutant Ninja Turtles was produced by Mirage Studios, 4 Kids Entertainment, 4Kids Productions, and Dong Woo Animation and distributed by 4 Kids Entertainment and was aired on Fox's Saturday morning kids' block in the US. The producers were Gary Richardson, Frederick U. Fierst, and Joellyn Marlow for the American team. Tae Ho Han was the producer for the Korean team.

Reception
The fourth season was also critically acclaimed because of its darker and depressing stories. It had 2.25 million views as of May 2006 and has a rank of 88%.

Episodes

References

External links

Season Four Episode list with detailed synopses at the Official Ninja Turtles website

2005 American television seasons
2006 American television seasons
Halloween fiction
Television episodes set in Japan
Television episodes set in Massachusetts
Season 4
Japan in non-Japanese culture
Usagi Yojimbo